Simon Akwali Okafor (November 16, 1934 – August 29, 2014) was a Roman Catholic bishop.

Born in the old Ifiteukpo, now Ifitedunu in Dunukofia Local Government Area of Anambra State, Nigeria on 16 November 1934, to his parents, Ogbuefi Okafor and Ifeoma Okafor (of blessed memory), Bishop Okafor (of blessed memory), was ordained as a priest on 21 July 1963 at the age of 29, by Bishop Godfrey Mary Okoye, C.S.Sp. (of blessed memory)

Okafor was appointed titular bishop of Augurus and auxiliary bishop of the Roman Catholic Diocese of Awka, Nigeria, in 1992.

On 9 September 1994, Bishop Simon Akwali Okafor, was appointed 2nd Catholic Bishop of Awka Diocese at the age of 59+, and retired on 17 April 2010 and the age of 75.

He died on Friday, 29 August 2014 at the age of 80, as Bishop Emeritus of Awka, and was buried on Tuesday, 7 October 2014 at the Crept Chapel, St Patrick's Cathedral. Awka.

As a priest, he served as the Secretary to the then Catholic Archbishop of the Old Onitsha Archdiocese (now Cardinal Francis Arinze)

As an educationist, who left indelible footprints, he was a lecturer and a Provost of the former College of Education in Awka.

Notes: Archives by Ifeoma Ezenyilimba of Fides Media Ltd

Notes

1934 births
2014 deaths
20th-century Roman Catholic bishops in Nigeria
21st-century Roman Catholic bishops in Nigeria
Roman Catholic bishops of Awka